The 2016 No Mercy was the 12th No Mercy professional wrestling pay-per-view (PPV) and livestreaming event produced by WWE. It was held exclusively for wrestlers from the promotion's SmackDown brand division. The event took place on October 9, 2016, at the Golden 1 Center in Sacramento, California. It was the first No Mercy held since 2008 and it was also the first SmackDown-exclusive No Mercy since 2006. This also made it the first No Mercy to air on WWE's online streaming service, the WWE Network, which launched in 2014. Unlike the majority of WWE's PPVs, No Mercy 2016 was not released on DVD or Blu-Ray. 

Eight matches were contested at the event, including one on the Kickoff pre-show. In the advertised main event, AJ Styles defeated Dean Ambrose and John Cena in a triple threat match to retain the WWE World Championship; this was the opening bout. The advertised main event was originally scheduled to close the show, but was changed the day of the event due to the second United States presidential debate airing at the same time that the match would have occurred. Due to this change, the final match was between Bray Wyatt and Randy Orton, which Wyatt won. In another prominent match, Dolph Ziggler defeated The Miz to win the Intercontinental Championship in a title vs. career match.

Production

Background
No Mercy was first held by WWE as a United Kingdom-exclusive pay-per-view (PPV) in May 1999. A second No Mercy was then held later that same year in October, but in the United States, which established No Mercy as the annual October PPV for the promotion until 2008. In 2009, No Mercy was replaced by Hell in a Cell as the annual October PPV. In April 2011, WWE ceased using its full name of "World Wrestling Entertainment" with the "WWE" name becoming an orphaned initialism, and in August that year, the first brand extension ended. In July 2016, WWE reintroduced the brand split, again dividing the roster between the Raw and SmackDown brands, where wrestlers were exclusively assigned to perform. Brand-exclusive PPVs also returned with the second brand extension and No Mercy was reinstated to be held on October 9, 2016, at the Golden 1 Center in Sacramento, California. Like during the first brand extension, in which No Mercy was SmackDown-exclusive from 2003 to 2006, the 2016 event was made a SmackDown-exclusive PPV. The 2016 event was the 12th event in the No Mercy chronology. In addition to traditional PPV, it was the first No Mercy to air on WWE's online streaming service, the WWE Network, which launched in February 2014.

Storylines
The card consisted of eight matches, including one on the Kickoff pre-show, that resulted from scripted storylines, where wrestlers portrayed villains, heroes, or less distinguishable characters in scripted events that built tension and culminated in a wrestling match or series of matches, with results predetermined by WWE's writers on the SmackDown brand. Storylines were produced on WWE's weekly television show SmackDown Live.

At SummerSlam, AJ Styles defeated John Cena. Styles went on to win the WWE World Championship at Backlash, when he defeated Dean Ambrose after a low blow and a Styles Clash. Two days later on SmackDown, Cena demanded a rematch against Styles in an attempt to become a 16-time world champion, equaling the record set by Ric Flair, while Ambrose invoked his rematch clause against Styles. SmackDown Commissioner Shane McMahon scheduled a triple threat match between Styles, Cena, and Ambrose for the title at No Mercy. Later that night, Ambrose and Cena defeated Styles and Intercontinental Champion The Miz. Afterwards, Ambrose attacked Cena with Dirty Deeds. The following week, Ambrose defeated Cena with a roll-up. After the match, Styles attacked Cena and Ambrose, which prompted SmackDown General Manager Daniel Bryan to schedule Styles to defend his title against Ambrose the following week on SmackDown, after which, Ambrose attacked Styles with Dirty Deeds. On the September 27 episode of SmackDown, after a distraction from Cena, Styles retained the title against Ambrose. After the match, Cena attacked Ambrose and Styles each with an Attitude Adjustment. On October 9, the day of the event, WWE announced that, due to No Mercy airing simultaneously with the second United States presidential debate, the world championship triple threat match would begin the pay-per-view portion of the event.

At Backlash, Becky Lynch defeated Alexa Bliss, Carmella, Naomi, Natalya, and Nikki Bella in a six-pack elimination challenge to become the inaugural SmackDown Women's Champion. On the September 13 episode of SmackDown, Alexa won a fatal five-way match by defeating Carmella, Nikki Bella, Natalya, and Naomi to receive a title opportunity against Lynch at No Mercy. The following week, Alexa attacked Becky during their contract signing. On October 8, it was revealed by the Wrestling Observer Newsletter that Becky Lynch would not compete at No Mercy due to an out-of-ring injury.

At Backlash, Heath Slater and Rhyno defeated The Usos in a tag team tournament final to become the inaugural SmackDown Tag Team Champions, which also earned Slater a SmackDown contract in the process. On the September 20 episode of SmackDown, The Usos defeated American Alpha to earn a rematch against Slater and Rhyno for the titles at No Mercy.

At Backlash, The Miz defeated Dolph Ziggler to retain the Intercontinental Championship when Maryse sprayed pepper spray in Ziggler's face. Two weeks later, Miz again defeated Ziggler in a title match after he used the spray on Ziggler. The next week, Ziggler put his career on the line if Miz gave him one more title shot; The Miz agreed to the match, to take place at No Mercy. The next week on SmackDown, Miz showed a video package highlighting Ziggler's most embarrassing moments in his career, including his days as a member of the Spirit Squad. Miz then introduced fellow Spirit Squad members, Mikey and Kenny, who first cheered and mocked Dolph before attacking him. Ziggler then fought off Mikey and Kenny, before Miz fled.

At Backlash, Bray Wyatt attacked Randy Orton backstage, leaving him unable to compete and winning their match by forfeit. In the following weeks, the two continued to taunt each other, including segments in which either wrestler went looking for the other backstage. On September 28, a match between the two was scheduled for No Mercy.

On the August 23 episode of SmackDown, Carmella attacked Nikki Bella before their scheduled match, then afterwards on Talking Smack, and again during a match on the October 4 episode of SmackDown. Subsequently, a match between the two was scheduled for No Mercy.

On August 16, Curt Hawkins began to appear in a series of vignettes similar to Chuck Norris facts, signalling his return to WWE on the SmackDown brand. In the last vignette, he revealed that he would be "stepping into the ring" at No Mercy.

On the September 13 episode of SmackDown, Jack Swagger appeared and confronted Baron Corbin. On the October 4 episode, Swagger defeated Corbin in controversial fashion. The referee called for the bell, believing Corbin had indicated submission, when he was in fact reaching for the rope to break the Patriot Lock applied by Swagger. The following day, a match between the two was scheduled for No Mercy.

On October 9, a match between The Hype Bros and American Alpha against The Ascension and The Vaudevillains was scheduled for the No Mercy Kickoff pre-show.

Event

Pre-show 
During the No Mercy Kickoff pre-show, Curt Hawkins made his WWE return. As advertised, he stepped into the ring. However, he did not compete, but announced that his first match would take place on the following episode of SmackDown.

After this, Shane McMahon and Daniel Bryan informed Alexa Bliss that for medical reasons, SmackDown Women's Champion Becky Lynch would not be able to compete, that the scheduled title match would be postponed to the November 8 episode of SmackDown, and that Bliss would face a different opponent later in the night.

Also during the pre-show, The Hype Bros (Mojo Rawley and Zack Ryder) and American Alpha (Chad Gable and Jason Jordan) faced The Ascension (Konnor and Viktor) and The Vaudevillains (Simon Gotch and Aiden English). In the end  Jordan performed Grand Amplitude on English to win the match.

Main show 
The actual pay-per-view opened with the advertised main event, which was the triple threat match in which AJ Styles defended the WWE World Championship against Dean Ambrose and John Cena. During the match, Cena executed an "Attitude Adjustment" on Ambrose for a near-fall. Cena applied the "STF" on Ambrose, who did not submit. Styles performed a "Springboard 450 Splash" on Ambrose for a near-fall. Styles executed a "Styles Clash" on Ambrose, which was followed by Cena applying the "STF" on Styles, but Ambrose broke the hold. Later, Ambrose applied the "Calf Crusher" and Cena applied the "STF" on Styles simultaneously; Styles submitted, but the referee continued the match as two participants cannot submit another one at the same time. Ambrose executed "Dirty Deeds" on Cena, but Styles voided the pinfall by pulling the referee out of the ring. In the end, after Cena executed a Super "Attitude Adjustment" on Ambrose, Styles attacked Cena with a chair immediately and pinned him to retain the title.

Next, Nikki Bella faced Carmella. The end came when Nikki executed a "Rack Attack 2.0" on Carmella to win the match.

After that, Heath Slater and Rhyno defended the SmackDown Tag Team Championship against The Usos (Jey and Jimmy Uso). The match ended when Rhyno executed a "Gore" on Jey to retain the titles.

In the fourth match, Jack Swagger faced Baron Corbin. In the end, Swagger applied the "Patriot Lock" on Corbin, but Corbin reached the ring apron, forcing Swagger to break the hold, and poked Swagger's eye. Corbin performed the "End of Days" on Swagger to win the match.

Next, Dolph Ziggler challenged The Miz for the Intercontinental Championship in a title vs. career match. During the match, Miz applied the "Figure Four Leglock", but Ziggler touched the ropes, forcing Miz to break the hold. Ziggler executed a "Zig Zag" on Miz for a near-fall. After Maryse blinded Ziggler with pepper spray, Miz executed a "Skull Crushing Finale", but Ziggler placed his foot on the bottom rope to void the pinfall. The Spirit Squad (Mikey and Kenny) appeared to distract Ziggler, but Ziggler knocked Mikey off the ring apron with a Superkick. Miz performed another "Skull Crushing Finale" on Ziggler for a near-fall. The referee ejected Maryse, Mikey, and Kenny from ringside. Ziggler executed a Superkick on Miz to win the title and save his career.

After that, Alexa Bliss came out. Earlier in the night, SmackDown Women's Champion Becky Lynch had been declared unable to compete. Bliss complained about her title opportunity being postponed only for her replacement opponent, Naomi, to interrupt her. In the end, Bliss attempted a Cross Armbar, but Naomi shifted her weight to pin Bliss and win the match.

In the final match, Randy Orton fought Bray Wyatt. During the match, Orton attempted an "RKO" on Wyatt, but Wyatt countered by throwing Orton over the broadcast table. Wyatt attempted "Sister Abigail" on Orton, but Orton countered with an "RKO" attempt, only for Wyatt to counter into a Uranage Slam for a near-fall. Outside the ring, Wyatt draped Orton over the steel steps and attempted a Running Senton, but Orton rolled off and Wyatt crashed onto the steps. In the climax, Orton executed an Elevated DDT on Wyatt and attempted an "RKO", but the lights went out and a returning Luke Harper appeared in the ring, distracting Orton. Wyatt executed "Sister Abigail" on Orton to win the match.

Aftermath
On the following SmackDown, Shane McMahon and Daniel Bryan challenged Raw to three traditional Survivor Series elimination matches – involving each brand's best five male wrestlers, best five female wrestlers, and best five tag teams, respectively, to which Raw Commissioner Stephanie McMahon accepted. Focus then shifted on determining which wrestlers would represent Team SmackDown for the three teams at Survivor Series the following month. Also during this time, Dean Ambrose became the number one contender against AJ Styles for the WWE World Championship at SmackDown's next pay-per-view, TLC: Tables, Ladders & Chairs, in a Tables, Ladders, and Chairs match. and Randy Orton joined The Wyatt Family in a "if you can't beat them, join them" scenario.

Dolph Ziggler offered The Miz a rematch for the Intercontinental Championship, but The Miz refused. Ziggler then made an open challenge to any Raw wrestler to face Ziggler for the title at Survivor Series. In response and thanks to Miz's wife Maryse, Miz got a rematch for the title before Survivor Series. Also, due to SmackDown defending their Intercontinental title against a wrestler from Raw, Daniel Bryan came to negotiations with Raw's General Manager Mick Foley to have Raw's WWE Cruiserweight Championship defended against a SmackDown wrestler. Bryan chose Kalisto and revealed that if Kalisto won, the entire cruiserweight division would come to SmackDown.

While this 2016 event was held exclusively for SmackDown, the 2017 event was held exclusively for Raw.

Results

References

External links 
 

2016
2016 in California
Events in Sacramento, California
Professional wrestling in Sacramento, California
2016 WWE Network events
Events in California
2016 WWE pay-per-view events
WWE SmackDown